Kollerud is a Norwegian surname. Notable people with the surname include:

Christian Christensen Kollerud (1767–1833), Norwegian farmer and politician
Else Kollerud Furre (1922–2019), Norwegian politician

Norwegian-language surnames